In politics, cordon sanitaire is the refusal of one political party to cooperate with certain other political parties. Often this is because the targeted party has strategies or an ideology perceived as unacceptable or radical and extremist.

National politics

Origins in Belgium
Beginning in the late 1980s, the term was introduced into the discourse on parliamentary politics by Belgian commentators.  At that time, the far-right Flemish nationalist Vlaams Blok party began to make significant electoral gains. Because the Vlaams Blok was considered a racist group by many, the other Belgian political parties committed to exclude the party from any coalition government, even if that forced the formation of grand coalition governments between ideological rivals. Commentators dubbed this agreement Belgium's cordon sanitaire. In 2004, its successor party, Vlaams Belang changed its party platform to allow it to comply with the law. While no formal new agreement has been signed against it, it nevertheless remains uncertain whether any mainstream Belgian party will enter into coalition talks with Vlaams Belang in the near future. Several members of various Flemish parties have questioned the viability of the cordon sanitaire.

With the electoral success of nationalist and extremist parties on the left and right in recent European history, the term has been transferred to agreements similar to the one struck in Belgium.

European Union
All of the political groups declared cordon sanitaire on far-right Identity and Democracy group in the Ninth European Parliament.

Some (though not all) of the Non-Inscrits members of the European Parliament are unaffiliated because they are considered to lie too far on the right of the political spectrum to be acceptable to any of the European Parliament party groups.

Estonia and Latvia
In Estonia and Latvia, "Russian-speaking" parties (LKS, For Stability! and Harmony in Latvia, and the Constitution Party and Centre Party in Estonia) had been excluded from participation in ruling coalitions at a national level until leadership change. Differing interpretations of the Soviet occupation between 1940 and 1990 and attitudes towards Vladimir Putin's current United Russia government in the Russian Federation are often cited as reasons to conclude coalition talks with other parties, even if said parties are perceived to be on the radical right.

The cordon is not absolute; the Centre Party of Estonia has briefly participated in three coalition governments in 1995, 2002–2003 and 2005–2007. The cordon was renewed in 2007, due to Edgar Savisaar's attitudes toward the Bronze Night. In 2016 Jüri Ratas of Centre became Prime Minister of Estonia, effectively ending any cordon around the party. In Latvia the cordon against the Harmony remains up to this day.

In Estonia, the cordon also was set up against the Conservative People's Party of Estonia between 2015 and 2019.

France
The policy of non-cooperation with Front National, together with the majoritarian two-round electoral system, leads to the permanent underrepresentation of the FN in the National Assembly. For instance, the FN won no seats out of 577 in the 2002 elections, despite receiving 11.3% of votes in the first round, as no FN candidates won a first-round majority and few even qualified (either by winning at least 12.5% of the local vote with 25% turnout or by being one of the top two finishers with less) to go on to the second round. In the 2002 presidential election, after the Front National candidate Jean-Marie Le Pen unexpectedly defeated Lionel Jospin in the first round, the traditionally ideologically-opposed Socialist Party encouraged its voters to vote for Jacques Chirac in the second round, preferring anyone to Le Pen. In 2017 election, and 2022 election his daughter and party successor Marine Le Pen reached the second round of the presidential election; both the Socialist Party and Republicans encouraged votes for her opponent Emmanuel Macron.

Germany
After German reunification, East Germany's former ruling party, the Socialist Unity Party of Germany (Sozialistische Einheitspartei Deutschlands, or SED), reinvented itself first (in 1990) as the Party of Democratic Socialism (PDS) and then (in 2005 before the elections) as the Left Party, in order to merge with the new group Labour and Social Justice – The Electoral Alternative that had emerged in the West. In the years following 1990, the other German political parties have consistently refused to consider forming a coalition with the PDS/Left Party on a federal level (which was possible in 2005 and 2013), while on state levels, so-called red-red coalitions with the SPD were formed (or red-red-green). The term cordon sanitaire, though, is quite uncommon in Germany for coalition considerations. A strict political non-cooperation (in which The Left would participate, should the instance ever arise) is only exercised against right-wing parties, such as the Republicans, and even the Republicans have exercised a cordon against the neo-Nazi National Democratic Party. Since 2013, the established major parties have refused to form state-level coalitions with the new right-wing populist party Alternative for Germany.

Israel
In Israel, the Joint List and its component parties—Hadash, Balad, Ta'al, Ma'an, and (formerly) Ra'am—are under a de facto cordon sanitaire, primarily for not supporting Zionism.  Following the 2021 Israeli legislative election, the conservative Ra'am, which had left the joint list and run on its own, entered into coalition with a number of predominantly Zionist parties to form the thirty-sixth government of Israel.

In the past there was a cordon sanitaire against the Kahanist party Kach, with Likud prime minister Yitzhak Shamir famously walked out of the Knesset floor during Meir Kahane's speeches. The party was eventually outlawed and disbanded, and cordons of various levels have been enforced on its successor parties, which were mostly limited to cooperation within the National Union and its successor coalitions until 2019, when then prime minister Benjamin Netanyahu orchestrated Otzma Yehudit's involvement in an electoral coalition in hopes of securing a parliamentary majority of supporters.

Netherlands
In the Netherlands, a parliamentary cordon sanitaire was put around the Centre Party (Centrumpartij, CP) and later on the Centre Democrats (Centrumdemocraten, CD), ostracising their leader Hans Janmaat. During the 2010 Cabinet formation, Geert Wilders' Party for Freedom (Partij voor de Vrijheid, PVV) charged other parties of plotting a cordon sanitaire; however, there never was any agreement between the other parties on ignoring the PVV. Indeed, the PVV was floated several times as a potential coalition member by several informateurs throughout the government formation process, and the final minority coalition under Mark Rutte between Rutte's People's Party for Freedom and Democracy and the Christian Democratic Appeal was officially "condoned" by the PVV. The coalition collapsed after PVV withdrew its support in 2012. Since then, all major parties refuse to cooperate with PVV. Since the split of the Forum for Democracy in 2020, all major parties but PVV also refuse to cooperate with FvD.

Slovenia
In Slovenia liberal, centre-left and left-wing parties led by LMŠ leader and later Prime Minister Marjan Šarec declared de facto cordon sanitaire and excluded the Slovenian Democratic Party (SDS) from coalition negotiations following the 2018 parliamentary election, due to its xenophobic and divisive rhetoric and policy, which was based primarily on the opposition to illegal migrations and the discreditation of political opponents. The same parties also claimed that SDS was illegally financed by foreign donations via its media (mostly capital from Hungarian companies close to Viktor Orbán, with whom SDS closely cooperates) and by loans from foreign national Dijana Đuđić, who personally financed the party with almost half million €. SDS won the election but all parties from centre to left wing rejected its invitation to start negotiations.

After a governmental crisis in 2020 the social liberal Modern Centre Party and the Democratic Party of Pensioners of Slovenia formed a coalition with SDS.

Turkey
In Turkey, Pro-Kurdish parties like Peoples' Democratic Party (HDP) are under a cordon sanitaire because of the accusation of cooperation with the banned Kurdistan Workers' Party which is currently designated as a terrorist organisation by European Union, UK, USA, Turkey and other countries. Kurdish parties that have allegedly cooperated with terrorist organisations have also been banned by the Constitutional Court of Turkey several times in the past. This process of banning, led the Kurdish Movement to be more willing to solve problems in favour of democratisation of Turkey and regionalism, rather than separating the country.

United Kingdom
In the United Kingdom, the far-right British National Party is completely ostracised by the political mainstream. Prominent politicians, including former Prime Minister and Conservative Party leader David Cameron, have been known to urge electors to vote for candidates from any party except the BNP. The eurosceptic UK Independence Party, which has itself been labelled as far-right, has categorically refused even limited cooperation with the BNP. Although the party has never held more than 60 of the some 22,000 elected positions in local government, it is generally agreed by all parties that the BNP should be excluded from any coalition agreement on those councils where no single party has a majority. When two BNP candidates were elected to the European Parliament at the 2009 election, the UK Government announced that it would provide them both with only the bare minimum level of support, denying them the ready access to officials and information that the other 70 British MEPs received.

Canada
In Canada, resistance to the formation of coalition governments among left-of-center parties has been attributed to an unwillingness to be seen as collaborating with the Bloc Québécois, which advocates for Quebecois independence. However, during the 2008–2009 Canadian parliamentary dispute, an agreement was made where the Bloc Québécois would provide supply and confidence to a potential coalition government formed by the Liberal Party and New Democratic Party. That government was never formed as the Conservative Party minority government ultimately retained the confidence of the House.

Examples
In Germany, the Social Democratic Party of Germany was excluded until the beginning of World War I (Burgfriedenspolitik). The SPD was even banned by the Anti-Socialist Laws in the end of the 19th century.
 In Lithuania Communist Party of Lithuania (CPSU) was not a party with which other parties would cooperate on the national level. The situation would exist from March 1990 to August 1991, when CPL (CPSU) was banned. A similar cordon was in place between 2002 and 2006, when all other parties refused to cooperate with the Liberal Democratic Party in the Seimas and municipal councils. Another similar cordon existed against the Way of Courage between 2012 and 2016.
 In Turkey, during the 1990s Islamist parties of the Millî Görüş movement were excluded from government formation and were banned several times with the exception of the so called "Refahyol" (1996–1997). The cordon sanitaire was lifted when the more moderate Justice and Development Party (AKP) in 2002 rose to power and the more radical heir Felicity Party joined the Nation Alliance in 2018.

Italy (1947–1994)

In Italy, the Italian Communist Party (PCI) and the Italian Social Movement (MSI) were excluded from Christian Democratic-led coalition governments during the Cold War. Only during the Zoli Cabinet/Segni II Cabinet/Tambroni Cabinet (1957–1958; 1959–1960) and the Historic Compromise (1976–1979) the Christian Democracy relied on either the MSI or the PCI. The end of the Cold War along with the Tangentopoli scandal and Mani pulite investigation resulted in a dramatic political realignment.

Norway (1970s–2013)
 In Norway, all parliamentary parties had consistently refused to formally join into a governing coalition at state level with the right-wing Progress Party until 2013 when the Conservative Party did so. In some municipalities however, the Progress Party cooperates with many parties, including the center-left Labour Party.

Israel (1984-1988)

In Israel, between 1984 and 1988 all other MKs boycotted the speeches of Kach leader Meir Kahane, to the point that they would even leave the Knesset restaurant whenever Kahane appeared. This process ended in 1988, when Kach was banned from participating in the upcoming election. Their indirect successor Otzma Yehudit ran with Religious Zionist Party in 2021 and was included in coalition talks.

Austria (1986–2000)
 In Austria after Jörg Haider became leader of the Freedom Party of Austria (FPÖ) in 1986, all other parties refused to cooperate with them until 2000 when the First Schüssel government was formed. This (FPÖ) government would last from 2000 to 2005, and a second (FPÖ) government would last from 2017 to 2019.

Czech Republic (1990–2018) 
The Communist Party of Bohemia and Moravia is effectively excluded from any possible coalition because of a strong anti-Communist presence in most political parties, including the Czech Social Democratic Party. This policy on national level remained up until 2018, when the KSČM supported the Andrej Babiš' cabinet. On regional level the KSČM still remains excluded from coalitions (e. g. after 2020 regional elections this policy forced the Czech Pirate Party and the Civic Democratic Party to form coalitions with the ANO 2011 in regions of Ústí nad Labem, Zlín and Moravia-Silesia).
A cordon sanitaire was also placed around Miroslav Sládek's national conservative party Rally for the Republic – Republican Party of Czechoslovakia while it was active in the Czech Parliament between 1992 and 1998. When any of its members was set to speak, other deputies would leave the Chamber of Deputies.

Spain (2003–2010)
In 2003, a majority of the Parliament of Catalonia consisting in the left-of-centre and pro-decentralisation PSC, ERC and ICV-EUiA parties reached a coalition agreement that included vetoing the right-of-centre, centralist People's Party in both subnational and national instances. This point of the agreement was later criticised by the resulting President of Catalonia Pasqual Maragall. The coalition agreement was reedited in 2006, but by 2010 the then PSC candidate José Montilla said his party wouldn't seek a new agreement with ERC.

Sweden (2010–2018)
In Sweden, the political parties in the Riksdag adopted a policy of non-cooperation with the right-wing Sweden Democrats. However, there have been exceptions where local politicians have supported resolutions from SD.

In October 2018, the Sweden Democrats went into a governing coalitions with the Moderate Party and the Christian Democrats for the first time in Staffanstorp Municipality, Sölvesborg Municipality, Herrljunga Municipality and Bromölla Municipality. In Bromölla, coalition felt apart in 2020, while new coalitions with the SD emerged in Svalöv Municipality (2019), Bjuv Municipality (2020) and Surahammar Municipality (2021).

However, in March 2019, Christian Democratic leader Ebba Busch announced that her party was ready to start negotiations with the Sweden Democrats in the Riksdag. The same year, Moderate Party leader Ulf Kristersson also signalled an end to the non-cooperation policy by holding meetings with the Sweden Democrats' leadership. Since 2018, the SD has formed governing coalitions in municipal councils with the Moderate Party and Christian Democrats. The opening of M and KD to SD and the January Agreement led to the dissolution of The Alliance. After Liberals stopped supporting the minority government they ended ruling out a coalition with SD.

In 2022, following the Tidö Agreement, Kristersson would form a minority government made up of M, KD, and L with confidence and supply support from SD.

See also
Non-LDP and non-JCP Coalition
Trasformismo

References

Further reading

Political metaphors
Political concepts